Ancylolomia paraetoniella is a moth in the family Crambidae. It was described by Turati in 1924. It is found in Libya.

References

Ancylolomia
Moths described in 1924
Moths of Africa